John Richardson Alison (November 21, 1912 – June 6, 2011) was a highly decorated American combat ace of World War II and is often cited as the father of Air Force Special Operations.

Early years
Born in Micanopy, Florida, near Gainesville in 1912, Alison graduated from the University of Florida School of Engineering and joined the United States Army Air Corps in 1936. He earned his wings and was commissioned at Kelly Field in 1937. Prior to America's entry into World War II, he served as Assistant Military Attache in England and helped British pilots transition into the P-40. In October 1941, Alison traveled to Moscow to administer the sensitive U.S.-Soviet P-40 Lend-Lease program. He trained Russian pilots in the P-40, A-20, and B-25 Mitchell aircraft. In his autobiography, Jimmy Doolittle wrote:

Combat
After ten months and repeated requests for reassignment to combat, Alison got his wish. In June 1942, he reported to the China-Burma-India Theater (CBI) to serve as Deputy Squadron Commander under major David Lee "Tex" Hill in the 75th Fighter Squadron, part of Colonel Robert Lee Scott Jr.'s 23rd Fighter Group, the USAAF successor of the AVG's famed Flying Tigers in the China-Burma-India Theater.

Alison was called into theater by the previous commander of the AVG, Brigadier General Claire Lee Chennault, who was serving as commander of the Fourteenth Air Force. On July 30, 1942, Alison was credited with the first night kills in the theater. For his experimental night interception, he was awarded the Distinguished Service Cross. Alison again demonstrated his aggressiveness in early 1943, when he took off during an attack on his own airfield, engaged three Mitsubishi A6M Zeros, and scored one probable kill. He then vectored arriving reinforcements to the battle, after which he made a stern attack on another enemy fighter at close range, shooting it down. His gallantry and fighting spirit earned him the Silver Star. Ending his tour as commander of the 75th Fighter Squadron, Alison left as an ace with seven confirmed victories and several probable kills. His former commanding officer, David Lee "Tex" Hill, had high praise for Alison:

Air Commando

Alison later commanded the 3rd Air Commando group in the Pacific serving in the Philippines and Okinawa.

Later years
After the war, he served as an Assistant Secretary of Commerce, President of the Air Force Association, and as a major general in the Air Force Reserve. He retired as vice president of the Northrop Corporation in 1984 and is a 1994 inductee into the Air Commando Hall of Fame. In 2005, Alison was inducted into the National Aviation Hall of Fame. In 2006, he was made an honorary member of the U.S. Army Ranger Hall of Fame.

Alison died on June 6, 2011, and was buried at Arlington National Cemetery on October 3, 2011. Air Force Chief of Staff General Norton A. Schwartz provided the eulogy at the Old Post Chapel at Joint Base Myer–Henderson Hall. Following the chapel service, Secretary of the Air Force Michael Donley presented the American flag to Alison's wife, Penni, at the graveside service. Alison was survived by Penni, and their two sons, John and David. Shortly before his passing, he authorized the Washington DC Chapter of the Air Commando Association to use his name and they are known as the John R. Alison Chapter of the Air Commando Association.

Awards and decorations
His awards and decorations include:

Distinguished Service Cross citation
Citation:

The President of the United States of America, authorized by Act of Congress, July 9, 1918, takes pleasure in presenting the Distinguished Service Cross to Major (Air Corps) John Richardson Alison, United States Army Air Forces, for extraordinary heroism in connection with military operations against an armed enemy while serving as Pilot of a P-40 Fighter Airplane in the 16th Fighter Squadron, 51st Fighter Group, Tenth Air Force, in aerial combat against enemy forces on 30 July 1942, over Hengyang, China. On that date, Major Alison took off in a P-40 fighting plane at 1:00 a.m. to intercept an enemy formation of three heavy bombers flying at 15,000 feet over Hengyang. Without hesitation, he closed for attack upon this superior force, and although receiving fire from the hostile wing ships in engine and cockpit, he delivered fire in succession to each of the three bombers, two of which burst into flames and crashed. The other turned from the attack with smoke pouring from both engines and probably did not reach its home base. With his damaged plane failing and pursuit impossible, Major Alison would have been justified under the circumstances, in leaving his ship by parachute, but he chose to attempt a night crash landing in order to save his vitally needed equipment. Being unable to reach the field, he landed in a nearby river, from which his plane was salvaged. In attacking this superior force at night, destroying two bombers and possibly the entire hostile formation after his ship had been damaged by enemy cross fire, and then attempting to save his stricken plane, Major Alison displayed extraordinary heroism and outstanding skill. His unquestionable valor in aerial combat is in keeping with the highest traditions of the military service and reflects great credit upon himself, the 10th Air Force, and the United States Army Air Forces.

Notes

References

External links
Air Force Magazine The All-American Airman, Walter J. Boyne, March 2000
Harry S. Truman LibraryJohn R. Alison Papers, 1945–1957
Veterans History ProgramJohn R. Alison Collection, including extended video interview available online.
National Aviation Hall of Fame" John R. Alison Enshrinee Biography

1912 births
2011 deaths
American World War II flying aces
Aviators from Florida
Burials at Arlington National Cemetery
National Aviation Hall of Fame inductees
Recipients of the Air Medal
Recipients of the Distinguished Flying Cross (United States)
Recipients of the Distinguished Service Cross (United States)
Recipients of the Distinguished Service Medal (US Army)
Recipients of the Silver Star
United States Air Force generals
United States Army Air Forces pilots
University of Florida College of Engineering alumni
Companions of the Distinguished Service Order
Recipients of the Legion of Merit
Military personnel from Florida
People from Micanopy, Florida